Geoffrey D. Hall (born October 10, 1948) is an American teacher and politician who represented the 2nd Middlesex District in the Massachusetts House of Representatives from 1991 to 2009. He previously served as a member of the Westford, Massachusetts Housing Authority from 1989 to 1992 and the Westford Board of Selectmen from 1983 to 1989.

Education 
Hall graduated from Salem State College and the University of Massachusetts Lowell.

References

1948 births
Democratic Party members of the Massachusetts House of Representatives
People from Westford, Massachusetts
Salem State University alumni
University of Massachusetts Lowell alumni
Living people